Watford Stadium Halt railway station was a railway station in Watford, Hertfordshire, United Kingdom on the branch line from  to . It served Vicarage Road stadium, home of Watford F.C., and was open only on match days.

History
The line was soon to be taken over by the London and North Western Railway (LNWR). Prior to this, the nearest stations available to football fans were Watford High Street and Watford Junction. A direct transport connection from the stadium would enable football officials to keep fans of "away" teams separate from Watford F.C. supporters and reduce instances of football hooliganism in Watford town centre. The station acquired the nickname of "Hooligan Halt".

Development of the station was funded jointly by the Football Trust, which contributed £50,000, Watford Borough Council (£80,000), Watford F.C. (£50,000), with the remaining £200,000 paid by British Rail. It was officially opened on 4 December 1982 by the rock musician and chairman of Watford Football Club, Elton John, and chairman of the Football Trust, Lord Aberdare. The inaugural train rolled into the station five minutes late. The station was only open on match days, with the first crowds passing through the station being Manchester United fans on the opening day.

The Croxley Green branch was temporarily closed in 1996 when a local road construction scheme severed the line and it was formally closed in 2003. However, Watford Stadium Halt had not been used for some years prior to this, although it is not known exactly when the halt was last used. The halt was not demolished and the station furniture, including the lampposts and signage, was left in situ. Despite nature reclaiming the station, the platforms and station furniture (apart from the station nameboards) were still in place when clearance work in preparation for the Croxley Rail Link began. The project would have involve re-opening part of the Watford and Rickmansworth line and running the Metropolitan line along this line, and the construction of two new stations. Watford Stadium Halt would not re-open. One of the new stations, Watford Vicarage Road, to be located on the other side of the Vicarage Road bridge, would serve Watford General Hospital and the football stadium.

On 25 January 2017, the Watford Observer newspaper published an update on the Croxley Rail Link confirming work had stopped as there was an ongoing funding issue.

References

External links 

Watford Stadium Halt in the years after abandonment
Pictures of the Halt during construction and when in use in addition to pictures showing the Halt in the years after abandonment
Pictures of the Croxley line, including Watford Stadium Halt, taken in 2009
A BBC TV news report on the opening of the station

Disused railway stations in Watford
Croxley Rail Link
Railway stations opened by British Rail
Railway stations in Great Britain opened in 1982
Railway stations in Great Britain closed in 1996
1982 establishments in England
1996 disestablishments in England